The Sabre Sprint was a product of the mini car company Sabre Cars, formed in 1984 in Wallsend, Newcastle upon Tyne. Steven Crabtree founded Sabre Cars in 1984 after years of producing fibreglass  products such as canoes, boats, sunbeds and fibreglass panels to other kit car brands. Crabtree designed and engineered the Sabre Sprint, produced between 1984 and 1986. Its boxy features resemble that of the Ford Escort MK3 or a Talbot Sunbeam. Approx 110 cars were produced by Sabre Cars.

Manufacture and design 
The Sabre Sprint was created from an all fibreglass monocoque body reinforced with kevlar and carbon fibre at the mountings for extra strength. It used a classic mini front subframe and A-Series engine at the front. The rear was a galvanised beam axle used with classic mini radius arms and coilover suspension. The car had four seats and a boot area which could be accessed by tilting the rear seats.

MK1 

The first design of the Sabre Sprint featured square headlights and an opening glass rear hatch.

MK2 

Introduced only a year after the MK1. The front was changed to twin round headlights and a redesigned rear featured a full opening hatch.

Hybrid 
Hybrids of the MK1 and MK2 were created during the change over period at Sabre Cars. These cars feature the twin round headlight front but with the MK1 style opening glass hatch.

Vario 
While the hybrid version was redesigned in 1985 an additional version was conceived. It had a removable fibreglass rear roof section, and closely resembled a convertible with the A and B pillars remaining in place. The boot had a removable lid which could be replaced with a hatchback estate roof. Despite seemingly like a good idea at the time, few Varios were sold.

Camper 
Just one of these Sabre Campers was produced.

End of manufacture 
The Sabre Sprint vanished in 1986, after approximately 110 cars had been built. Some of them made it into motorsport, rallying, hill climbing and such due to the lightweight but strong design.

The Sabre moulds ended up the property of a nearby company. The company later produced the FRA Mini based on the monocoque floor pan of the Sabre moulds. The FRA Minis have the same shortened floorpan as the sabre sprint.

References

Companies established in 1984
Companies based in Newcastle upon Tyne
Car manufacturers of the United Kingdom